The DNV GL - Automotive Executive of the Year Award recognizes excellence in leadership and innovation within the automotive industry. Since being launched in 1964, the award has been given to top auto executives, including: Marco Mattiacci (2012), Alan Mulally (2011), Elon Musk (2010), James O'Sullivan (2009), Carroll Shelby (2008), Jim Press (2007), Bill Ford (2006), Dieter Zetsche (2003), Rick Wagoner (2001), Jac Nasser (1999), Robert Eaton (1997), Thomas Stallkamp (1996), Roger Smith (1984), Lee Iacocca (1983), Bob Lund (1980), Henry Ford II (1973) and John DeLorean (1972).

Each honoree is nominated by an Advisory Committee of automotive journalists, representatives from the supplier community and industry analysts. Automotive Executive of the Year nomination criteria include entrepreneurial and creative thinking, exemplary leadership and professional integrity. Nominations are not directly linked to company performance or individual popularity. In some cases, the Advisory Committee may elect to give a Lifetime Achievement Award, honoring cumulative innovation and leadership.

The Automotive Executive of the Year Award is presented to an annual honoree during an invitation-only luncheon held at the Detroit Athletic Club in downtown Detroit, Mich. The historic DAC has served as the event venue since 1964.

Each honoree is presented with the DNV Navigator Award, an authentic working brass nautical compass (approximately 10 x 10 inches) enclosed in a teak wood box. The compass symbolizes the significance of navigation throughout the challenges of industry leadership. In addition, honorees are presented with an original watercolor portrait created by Michigan artist, Werner Claussen.

Award Ownership

The award has been owned by DNV GL since its purchase in 2006. DNV GL - Business Assurance is a global services provider for management system certification to TS 16949, ISO 9001 and ISO 14001, and other national and international standards. Other services include training, hospital accreditation, food safety certification, product certification and climate change services.

Award History 
Click here for a complete list of winners Automotive of the Year Award Past Winners

See also

 List of motor vehicle awards

References 
The Detroit Free Press, February 17, 2008, 2E

External links 
 DNV GL Website
 DNV GL - Healthcare
 DNV GL - Business Assurance
 DNV GL - Sustainability Advisory Services

Motor vehicle awards